USNS Navajo (T-ATF-169) is a United States Navy  which was in service from 1980 to 2016.

Navajo was laid down on 14 December 1977 by the Marinette Marine Corporation at Marinette, Wisconsin. Launched on 20 December 1979, and delivered to the U.S. Navy on 13 June 1980, Navajo was assigned to the Military Sealift Command (MSC), and placed in non-commissioned service as USNS Navajo (T-ATF-169) in 1980.

USNS Navajo was stricken from the register on 1 October 2016.

Lost anchor incident
On 28 July 2012 the ship was conducting training near the entrance to Pearl Harbor, Hawaii when a parted mooring line caused the ship to dump 8,000 pounds of expensive anchor, chain, and heavy rope on the ocean floor 150 feet below.  The equipment was recovered on 9 August 2012.

References

External links

 NavSource Online: Service Ship Photo Archive: USNS Navajo (T-ATF-169)

 

Tugs of the United States Navy
Cold War auxiliary ships of the United States
Ships built by Marinette Marine
1979 ships